Chatham Heights is an unincorporated community in Stafford County, in the U.S. state of Virginia.

Geography

Transportation

Chatham Heights is bisected by Virginia State Route 212 (Chatham Heights Road), which passes north–south through the community. The community also served by Virginia State Route 218 (which connects the community to U.S. Route 1) in the north and Virginia Route 3 Business in the south.

Fredericksburg Regional Transit provides its FRED bus service in the community. The RF&P Subdivision passes east of the community, and Fredericksburg station across the Rappahannock River provides access to Amtrak and Virginia Railway Express services.

References

Unincorporated communities in Virginia
Unincorporated communities in Stafford County, Virginia